The Southland rugby league team are New Zealand rugby league team that represents the Southland Rugby League. In the past they have been nicknamed the Rams.

History
In 1908 Southland was involved in some of the first provincial matches in the country when it played a home and away series against Otago. The first game was played at Caledonia Ground in Dunedin on 3 October and used goalposts which were rented from the Otago Rugby Union. The Southland side included Ned Hughes, a former All Black. Otago won the match 11-8. A return match was played at Queens Park, Invercargill on 7 October. Southland was able to win the match 30-14 and draw the series.

In 1998 Southland recorded its first ever win over the West Coast.

In 2010 former Southland Stags player Iona Sipa switched codes and represented the Rams.

A home and away series will be held in 2011 between Canterbury, Tasman, the West Coast, Otago and Southland.

References

New Zealand rugby league teams
Rugby league in Southland, New Zealand
1908 establishments in New Zealand